Moses Lake-Othello, WA CSA is the United States Census Bureau's official name for the combined statistical area that includes the Moses Lake micropolitan area (Grant County) as well as the Othello micropolitan area (Adams County). The population was 112,514 as of 2015. The CSA is anchored by the cities of Moses Lake, and Othello (although the city of Ephrata is larger than Othello). The CSA also contains the city of Ritzville—the county seat of Adams County.

Demographics

References 

Combined statistical areas of the United States
Micropolitan areas of Washington (state)
Moses Lake, Washington